The 2017 International Court of Justice election began on 20 November 2017 at the United Nations Headquarters in New York City. In the set of triennial elections, the General Assembly and the Security Council concurrently elect five judges to the Court for nine-year terms, in this case beginning on 6 February 2018. From the seven candidates, the five winners were Abdulqawi Yusuf (Somalia), Antônio Augusto Cançado Trindade (Brazil), Nawaf Salam (Lebanon), Ronny Abraham (France) and Dalveer Bhandari (India).

Background
The International Court of Justice (ICJ), based in The Hague, is one of the principal organs of the United Nations. Also known as the World Court, it adjudicates legal disputes between states, and provides advisory opinions on legal questions submitted by other UN organs or agencies.

The court consists of 15 judges, with five judges elected every three years. (In the case of death or other vacancy, a judge is elected for the remainder of the term.) Judges are required to be independent and impartial; they may not exercise any political or administrative function, and do not act as a representative of their home state.

Elections of members of the Court are governed by articles 2 through 15 of the Statute of the International Court of Justice.

The five judges whose terms expired in February 2018, with their nationality, were:

Abdulqawi Yusuf (Somali) (vice-president of the Court at time of election)
Antônio Augusto Cançado Trindade (Brazilian)
Christopher Greenwood (British)
Dalveer Bhandari (Indian)
Ronny Abraham (French) (president of Court at time of election)

Of these five, all were candidates for re-election.

Election procedure
The General Assembly and the Security Council proceed, independently of one another, to elect five members of the Court.

To be elected, a candidate must obtain an absolute majority of votes both in the General Assembly and in the Security Council. The words “absolute majority” are interpreted as meaning a majority of all electors, whether or not they vote or are allowed to vote. Thus 97 votes constitute an absolute majority in the General Assembly and 8 votes constitute an absolute majority in the Security Council (with no distinction being made between permanent and non-permanent members of the Security Council).

Only those candidates whose names appear on the ballot papers are eligible for election. Each elector in the General Assembly and in the Security Council may vote for not more than five candidates on the first ballot and, on subsequent ballots for five less the number of candidates who have already obtained an absolute majority.

When five candidates have obtained the required majority in one of the organs, the president of that organ notifies the president of the other organ of the names of the five candidates. The president of the latter does not communicate such names to the members of that organ until that organ itself has given five candidates the required majority of votes.

After both the General Assembly and the Security Council have produced a list of five names that received an absolute majority of the votes, the two lists are compared. Any candidate appearing on both lists is elected. But if fewer than five candidates have been thus elected (as happened in 2017), the two organs proceed, again independently of one another, at a second meeting and, if necessary, a third meeting to elect candidates by further ballots for seats remaining vacant, the results again being compared after the required number of candidates have obtained an absolute majority in each organ.

If after the third meeting, one or more seats still remain unfilled, the General Assembly and the Security Council may form a joint conference consisting of six members, three appointed by each organ. This joint conference may, by an absolute majority, agree upon one name for each seat still vacant and submit the name for the respective acceptance of the General Assembly and the Security Council. If the joint conference is unanimously agreed, it may submit the name of a person not included in the list of nominations, provided that candidate fulfills the required conditions of eligibility to be a judge on the ICJ.

If the General Assembly and the Security Council ultimately are unable to fill one or more vacant seats, then the judges of the ICJ who have already been elected shall proceed to fill the vacant seats by selection from among those candidates who have obtained votes either in the General Assembly or in the Security Council. In the event of a tie vote among the judges, the eldest judge shall have a casting vote.

Candidates

Qualifications
Article 2 of the Statute of the ICJ provides that judges shall be elected “from among persons of high moral character, who possess the qualifications required in their respective countries for appointment to the highest judicial offices, or are jurisconsults of recognized competence in international law”.

Nomination procedure
Nominations of candidates for election to the ICJ are made by individuals who sit on the Permanent Court of Arbitration (PCA). For this purpose, members of the PCA act in "national groups" (i.e. all the PCA members from any individual country). (In the case of UN member states not represented in the PCA, the state in question may select up to four individuals to be its "national group" for the purpose of nominating candidates to the ICJ.)

Every such "national group" may nominate up to four candidates, not more than two of whom shall be of their own nationality. Before making these nominations, each "national group" is recommended to consult its highest court of justice, its legal faculties and schools of law, and its national academies and national sections of international academies devoted to the study of law.

2017 nominees
By a communication dated 1 February 2017, the Secretary-General of the United Nations invited the "national groups" to undertake the nomination of persons  as judges of the ICJ, and submit the nominations no later than 3 July 2017.

The nominated candidates for the 2017 election are as follows:

Election

Day 1

Sources:

The Zambian delegation withdrew the candidacy of Chaloka Beyani prior to the first round of voting. Having received majority support in both the General Assembly and the Security Council, Ronny Abraham, Antônio Augusto Cançado Trindade, Abdulqawi Ahmed Yusuf and Nawaf Salam were elected to the Court in the fifth round of the first day of voting. The General Assembly and Security Council then proceeded to vote to fill the fifth vacant seat between Dalveer Bhandari and Christopher Greenwood. No candidate received the required absolute majorities in both bodies.

Day 2

Sources:

In all rounds of voting Dalveer Bhandari received the majority of votes in the General Assembly and Christopher Greenwood received the majority of votes in the Security Council.

Day 3

Sources:

Prior to the elections the UK withdrew the candidacy of Christopher Greenwood. Dalveer Bhandari was elected to the last vacant seat.

Aftermath
Christopher Greenwood's defeat marked the first time the United Kingdom would not have a judge at the International Court of Justice, the first time a permanent member of the United Nations Security Council would not have a judge at the Court and the first time a sitting member to the court lost to another sitting member. Bhandari's election also upset the tradition of five seats being occupied by the Western European and Others Group and three seats being occupied by the Asia-Pacific Group.

Following the election, which was seen as a loss by the UK, the Foreign Affairs Select Committee of the House of Commons of the United Kingdom published a report, containing its conclusions and recommendations to the UK government regarding the election.

References 

International Court of Justice elections
2017 elections in the United States